Sanningen kommer om natten is the fourth studio album released by Swedish singer Sarah Dawn Finer. It was released on 10 October 2012. Most songs were written by Mauro Scocco and produced by Johan Röhr. It also contains the singles "Nu vet du hur det känns" and "Balladen om ett brustet hjärta".

Track listing
 Tårar blir till guld - Mauro Scocco
 Den andra kvinnan - Mauro Scocco
 Balladen om ett brustet hjärta - Mauro Scocco
 Med dig vid min sida - Mauro Scocco
 Sagan om oss två (duet with Salem Al Fakir) - Sarah Dawn Finer, Salem Al Fakir
 Vasastan - Mauro Scocco
 Nu vet du hur det känns - Mauro Scocco
 Stockholm om natten (with Näääk) - Mauro Scocco
 Såna som jag - SDF & Mauro Scocco
 Lova mig ingenting - Sarah Dawn Finer & Magnus Tingsek
 Till dig - Mauro Scocco
 Kärleksvisan (bonus track, acoustic version) - Sarah Dawn Finer & Peter Hallström

Charts

Weekly charts

Year-end charts

References

2012 albums
Sarah Dawn Finer albums
Swedish-language albums